Patna Museum is the state museum of the Indian state of Bihar. Started on 3 April 1917 during the British Raj to house the historical artefacts found in the vicinity of Patna, it is in the style of Mughal and Rajput architecture and is known locally as the Jadu Ghar. The artefacts from ancient India era to 1764 have now been transferred to Bihar Museum.

The KP Jayaswal Research Institute (KPJRI) which carries out research in the field of history and archaeology also operates out of Patna Museum and was established by the Bihar Government.

History

The museum was constructed by the British to conserve and display the historical artifacts found in the vicinity of the state capital. The concept of having a museum arose in 1912, after Bihar and Bengal were separated. Patna Museum started functioning in 1915 from the commissioner's bungalow, on the campus of A. N. Sinha Institute.

The artifacts were then shifted to new rooms at the Patna High Court building before being taken to the present building in 1929. The land that was selected for the museum, in 1925, was on Patna-Gaya road (now Budh Marg). The two-storeyed building, designed by Rai Bahadur Bishnu Swarup, was completed in 1928. It was opened as the first museum of Bihar and Orissa Province by then Governor of Bihar and Orissa, Sir Hugh Lansdown Stephenson.

Collections
Items on display in the multipurpose museum include archaeological objects, coins, art objects, paintings, instruments, textiles, paintings, thankas, bronze images and sculptures and terra cotta images by Hindu and Buddhist artists. It has a rare collection of British-period paintings depicting day-to-day life, as well as a fine collection related to the first President of India, Rajendra Prasad. It also houses a World War I cannon.

The fossil of a tree said to be more than 200 million years old is on display, as is a casket — unearthed in 1958 by archaeologist, A. S. Altekar, at the Relic Stupa of Vaishali — said to contain the sacred ashes (relics) of Gautama Buddha. A Didarganj Yakshi statue, discovered on a Ganges riverbank in 1917, was the museum's most prized collection, which was later shifted to Bihar Museum. The artefacts from ancient India era to 1764 are kept in Bihar Museum and those of post-1764 period are kept at Patna Museum.
Rahul Sankrityayan donated 10,000 manuscripts that are written in gold and silver on handmade papers and books on Buddhist philosophy that were once in the library of ancient Nalanda and Vikramshila universities. These manuscript were taken to Tibet dating back of around 700 years ago before the destruction of these universities. These manuscripts were brought by him. 
Beginning November 2009, a project was started to build a replacement museum in Patna to enable the display of larger collections.

Heritage tunnel to Bihar Museum
In January 2023, Government of Bihar appointed Delhi Metro Railway Corporation Ltd as consultant for the construction of a 1.4-km-long proposed subway (heritage tunnel) between Bihar Museum and Patna Museum.

K. P. Jayaswal Research Institute

The K. P. Jayaswal Research Institute in Patna was established by the Government of Bihar in 1950 with the object of promoting "historical research, archaeological excavation and investigations and publication of works of permanent value to scholars". The institute is currently based out of Patna Museum.

Gallery

See also
International Museum Day
Bihar Museum
Jalan Museum

References

Art museums and galleries in India
Archaeological museums in India
State museums in India
Museums in Patna
Museums established in 1917
1917 establishments in British India
Buildings and structures in Patna